The fifth edition of Liège–Bastogne–Liège Femmes, a road cycling one-day race in Belgium, was held on 25 April 2021. It was the eight event of the 2021 UCI Women's World Tour.

Route
Similar to the 2019 and 2020 editions, the race finished in Liège. At , the race was approximately half the distance of the men's event. It started in Bastogne, from where it headed north to finish in Liège on the same location as the men's race. The route featured seven categorised climbs: the Côte de Wanne, Côte de la Haute-Levée, Col de Rosier, Côte de Desnié, Côte de La Redoute, Côte des Forges and Côte de la Roche aux faucons.

Teams
Nine UCI Women's WorldTeams and fourteen UCI Women's Continental Teams competed in the race.

UCI Women's WorldTeams

 
 
 
 
 
 
 
 
 

UCI Women's Continental Teams

Results

UCI World Tour

References

2021 UCI Women's World Tour
2021 in Belgian sport
2021
April 2021 sports events in Belgium